Al-Maimouna Stadium is a multi-purpose stadium in Maysan, Iraq. It is currently used mostly for football matches and is the home stadium of Maysan FC. Opened in 2012, it has a seating capacity of 2,000 people.

See also 
List of football stadiums in Iraq

References 

Football venues in Iraq
Athletics (track and field) venues in Iraq
Multi-purpose stadiums in Iraq
Sports venues completed in 2012